The role of women in the Crusades is frequently viewed as being limited to domestic or illicit activities during the Crusades.  While to some extent this is true, they nevertheless played a significant role, taking part in such activities including armed combat in the battles of the Holy Land. This article focuses on the First Crusades and identifies known participants. It also highlights some of the more famous women of the later crusades.  For a discussion of the sociological and religious aspects of the mixing of women with the predominantly male crusaders, the reader is referred to the referenced documents.

While some women remained at home to act as regents for their estates during the crusades, many other women went on quests and fought in battle. Noblewomen fought in combat, their upbringing likely preparing them for this possibility, going so far as to include lessons on riding into battle.

However, it was not only noblewomen who participated in the crusades. Women who were of the common people were also present throughout the venture, performing tasks such as removing lice from soldiers' heads and/or washing clothes. In fact, the washerwoman was the only role for a woman approved by the Catholic Church and permitted during the First Crusade, as long as they were unattractive, for fear that the troops would engage with them in sexual relations. However, this stipulation was typically not obeyed and all types and classes of women took part in the crusades. Every time an army marched, several women would join them as sutlers or servants, as well as prostitutes. Unmentioned in victory, they took the blame for defeat and were purged from the campaign several times throughout the crusades, for relations with them were considered sinful among soldiers who had left their homelands to fight a holy cause and were supposed to be pure in thought and deed. In addition, numerous nuns also accompanied the religious men, namely priests and bishops, that traveled as part of the quests, while other women took up arms, an anathema to their Muslim foes.

The appearance of women was less common among western chroniclers whose focus was more male-dominated. However, mentions of female crusaders are more commonly found in Muslim accounts of the Crusades, as the aggressiveness of Christian women was often seen as a way for Muslims to demonstrate how ruthless and depraved their foes could be. During the later crusades, many women whose stories remain were from the Middle East region, including one of a Muslim woman who fought the crusaders.

Contemporaneous historians 

The story of women in the Crusades begins with Anna Komnene, the daughter of Byzantine Emperor Alexios I Komnenos. She wrote a valuable history of the First Crusade, providing a view of the campaign from the Byzantine perspective.  She was exiled to a monastery before the work could be finished.

The challenges faced by women of the crusades can be summarized by writings by Fulcher of Chartres, chaplain of Baldwin I of Jerusalem, who stated

Fulcher noted that mass hysteria had surrounded the holy quest of the Crusades, richly demonstrated by the belief that even a lowly waterfowl led by a nun [see below], had been blessed by the Holy Spirit and would lead them to Jerusalem.

Nuns of the First Crusade 

A large number of nuns are believed to have traveled to the Holy Land during the Crusades, but only three are known from the First Crusade, and for only one of these do we know a name. [Note that Riley-Smith uses the term "anonyma" to refer to a woman of unknown name and this write up does the same.]
 Anonyma of Cambrai, was the religious leader of a sect traveling with Count Emich of Flonheim, who believed her goose to be filled with the Holy Spirit, even going so far as to allow the spirit-filled animal to direct the sect's course. The sect was not heard of again after the goose died.  This story is reported by Fulcher and Albert of Aix. That Gulbert of Nogent suggested that the goose may then have been served as a holiday meal requires no further comment.
 Anonyma, nun of the monastery of Santa Maria and Correa, Trier, who, as part of the People's Crusade, was taken by the Muslims during the Battle of Civetot that devastated the force of Peter the Hermit, who had returned to Constantinople for supplies.  When she was liberated in 1097, she apparently eloped with her Turkish captor. Her name remains a mystery.
 Americas, a nun of Altejas, who, following the direction Pope Urban II, went to her bishop for his blessing to found a hospice for the poor in the Holy Land.

Wives of the First Crusaders 

According to Riley-Smith, there were seven of the wives of the first Crusaders that accompanied their husbands to the Holy Land.  An eighth participated in the 1107 battles of Bohemond of Antioch-Tatanto against the Byzantine Empire (sometimes referred to as a crusade).  They were as follows.
 Godehilde, daughter of Raoul II of Tosny, Seigneur de Conches-en-Ouche, who accompanied her husband Baldwin I of Jerusalem, as well as a contingent of their household. While he was marching to Cilicia, she fell ill and died in Kahramanmaraş, Turkey, depriving him of the funding from her lands.  He later entered into bigamous marriages with an Armenian, Arda, whom he abandoned, and Adelaide del Vasto.  If the rumors of his homosexuality were true, his multiple marriages were certainly for personal gain and his behavior on the crusade did not meet the accepted standards of chivalry of the time.
 Hadvide, daughter of Arnold I, Count of Chiny, who accompanied her husband Dodo of Cons, a confidant of Godfrey of Bouillon.  Both Hadvide and Dodo returned from the crusade unscathed. Arnold, a conspirator against Godfrey, among his many other misdeeds, did not have his sons take the cross, as erroneously reported by a later count, the opportunistic Louis V. Hadvide's support of her husband appears to be the only redeeming act of this generation of the Chiny countship.
 Elvira of Leon-Castile, illegitimate daughter of King Alfonso VI of León and Castile, who traveled, while pregnant, with her husband Raymond IV of St. Gilles, Count of Toulouse.  After her husband was killed at the siege of Tripoli in 1106, she gave birth to their son Alfonso Jordan, later Count of Toulouse, and then returned home to Castile. There she married Fernando Fernández de Carrión and had three additional children.
 Emma of Hereford, Countess of Norfolk, traveled with her husband Ralph I of Gael, a Breton leader first under Robert Curthose, and then with Bohemund I of Antioch during the siege of Nicaea.  Ralph was a participant in the Revolt of the Earls against the rule of William the Conqueror. Emma's parents were William Fitz-Osbern and Adeliza (daughter of Roger I of Tosny), and so was cousin to Baldwin's wife Godehilde, described above.  Both Emma and her husband died en route to Jerusalem.
 Florine of Burgundy accompanied her husband Sweyn in the First Crusade. She, a warrior like her husband, is discussed in detail below.
 Humberge of Le Puiset traveled with her husband Walo II of Chaumont-en-Vexin.  Humberge was the sister of the Crusader Everard III of Le Puiset, Viscount of Chartres, and daughter of Hugues "Blavons" de Bretenil and Alix de Montlhéry (daughter of Guy I of Montlhéry). Walo was killed during the Siege of Antioch in 1098, but it remains unclear as to the fate of Humberge.  Their son Drogo was also prominent in the First Crusade.
 Edith, daughter of William de Warenne, 1st Earl of Surrey, accompanied her husband Gerard of Gournay-en-Bray with both the armies of Hugh the Great and Robert Curthose. Their son Hugh II fought in the Second Crusade.
 Mabel of Roucy, who accompanied her husband Hugh I of Jaffa to the Holy Land.
 Helie of Burgundy, accompanied her husband Bertrand of Toulouse in his quest to claim the role of Count of Tripoli.
 Anonyma of Lèves accompanied her husband Ralph the Red of Pont-Echanfray, in the Crusade of Bohemond of Antioch-Taranto, 1107–1108.  Anonyma was the daughter of Odeline of Le Puiset and Joscelin of Lèves, and so was the cousin of Humberge of Le Puiset.  Ralph had been a loyal knight of Bohemond's father Robert Guiscard.  Ralph died in the White Ship disaster of 1120.
 Emeline, accompanied her husband Fulcher of Bouillon, a knight in the army of Godfrey of Bouillon, captured and beheaded during the siege of Antioch. She was captured, taken to Azaz and married to a Turkish mercenary.
 Corba of Thorigne, wife of Geoffrey Burel, Lord of Amboise, who participated in the Crusade of 1101. Corba was captured by the Turks and her ultimate fate is unknown.

Warrior women of the Crusades 

A number of women took the cross and battled the Muslims, some with their husbands, some without; numerous royal women fought as Crusaders, and at least one against them. The six most prominent examples of these warriors are given below, the most famous of which is Eleanor of Aquitaine.
 Florine of Burgundy, a warrior-princess who accompanied her husband Sweyn the Crusader, Prince of Denmark in the First Crusade.  Florine was the daughter of Odo I, Duke of Burgundy, and his wife Sybilla (an ancestor of Marie Antoinette), while Sweyn was one of up to twenty children of Sweyn II, King of Denmark, by various concubines.  Florine and Sweyn commanded a force of 1,500 cavalries progressing across the plains of Cappadocia when they were ambushed by an overwhelming Turkish force.  Both were killed along with most of their force.
 Ida of Formbach-Ratelnbert (Ida of Cham), widow of Leopold II, Margrave of Austria.  During the Crusade of 1101, Ida led an army marching towards Jerusalem.  They were ambushed at Heraclea Cybistra by Kilij Arslan I and, depending on the source, she was either killed or carried off to his harem.
 Cecilia of Le Bourcq, Lady of Tarsus, sister of Baldwin II of Jerusalem and wife of Roger of Salerno, prince-regent of Antioch. Cecilia helped organize the defenses of Antioch in the Muslim attacks of 1119 in which her husband was killed.
 Melisende, Queen of Jerusalem, daughter of Baldwin II of Jerusalem.  Melisende, ruler of Jerusalem after her father's death, sent an army to aid the Crusader state of Edessa which was under siege and eventually fell.  Her pleas to Pope Eugene III for help led to the disastrous Second Crusade.
Ermengard of Anjou, divorced wife of William IX of Aquitaine and daughter of Fulk IV of Anjou, who went on an unspecified crusade after 1118.
 Eleanor of Aquitaine, Queen consort of the Franks.  Eleanor accompanied her husband Louis VII on the Second Crusade, as the leader of the soldiers from the Duchy of Aquitaine, which included some of her royal ladies-in-waiting.  The crusade accomplished little, and the disagreements on strategy between the king and queen eventually led to the annulment of their marriage.  Her subsequent marriage to Henry II of England produced a son, Richard the Lionheart. After becoming king, Richard led the English contingent in the Third Crusade, with Eleanor serving as regent in his absence.
 Margaret of Beverley, English commoner who took part in the Siege of Jerusalem in 1187.
 Shajar al-Durr, Sultan (or, incorrectly, Sultana) of Egypt during the Seventh Crusade. As wife of sultan As-Salih Ayyub, who had become gravely ill, Shajar helped organize the defenses of Egypt. After the sultan's death, the army supported her in becoming the first female sultan. Shajar's forces defeated the leader of the crusade, Louis IX of France, at Damietta. The Caliph al-Musta'sim in Baghdad refused to allow her the throne and installed the Mamluk Izz al-Din Aybak in her place. Shajar married Aybak and ruled with him for seven years. Unsure of her position, Shajar had him murdered by her servants; subsequently, she was stripped and beaten to death by the servants of Aybak's 15-year-old son and former wife. Thrown naked from the top of the Red Tower, she lay in the surrounding moat for three days until finally being buried in a tomb near the Mosque of Ibn Tulun.
 Margaret of Provence, Queen consort of France. Margaret accompanied her husband Louis IX and sister Beatrice on the Seventh Crusade. After her husband's capture, she led the negotiations for his release and, in fact, was the only woman to ever lead a crusade, if however briefly.  Her bravery and decisiveness were chronicled by her contemporary, Jean de Joinville.

Other women of the Crusades 

The stories of numerous other women who played a role in the Crusades have been documented. Here is a list of those known at this time.  All can be referenced from Volume III of Runciman's "A History of the Crusades."
 Isabella I, Queen regnant of Jerusalem during the Third Crusade.
 Eudokia Angelina, first consort of Stefan the First-Crowned of Serbia and later the mistress of Alexios V Doukas, with whom she fled Constantinople during the Fourth Crusade.
 Euphrosyne Doukaina Kamatera, wife of Emperor Alexios III Angelos, left behind in Constantinople as her husband fled during the Fourth Crusade.
 Margaret of Hungary, daughter of Béla III of Hungary, first married to Emperor Isaac II Angelos and then Boniface of Montferrat, leader of the Fourth Crusade.
 Maria of Antioch-Armenia was Lady of Toron, a major Crusader castle in Lebanon when, at the end of the Sixth Crusade, land taken by Saladin was returned to Armenia.
 Eleanor of Castile accompanied her husband Edward I of England on the Eighth Crusade and gave birth to their daughter Joan of Acre in the Holy Land.
 Isabella of Aragon, Queen consort of France, accompanied her husband Phillip III of France on the Eighth Crusade.
 Alice of Jerusalem, Princess consort of Antioch.
 Constance of Antioch, Princess of Antioch.
 Lucia of Tripoli, the last countess of Tripoli.

Regents of the estates of the Crusaders 

While the men of the Crusades died in frequent battles, the women lived in comparative freedom. They lived long lives and acted as regents to their estates and young children. As widows, they held a degree of independence that they had previously lacked, allowing them control over their own property, the opportunity to preside over courts and trade meetings, and fulfilling obligations of military and political service, in direct contravention of European gender norms of the period.  As more and more property became concentrated in their hands it became obvious that women constituted one of the main sources of "continuity" in the Frankish Levant.

Furthermore, for many women in the Frankish Levant marriage was a way for them to advance both socially and financially, allowing them to move up in status with their husband when he was alive and then prosper even more by inheriting more land when said husband died.  For instance, Agnes of Courtenay, originally a noblewoman of Edessa, remarried multiple times and by the time of her death in 1186 was "... the first lady in the kingdom (of Jerusalem), wife of the Lord of Sidon, dowager lady of Ramla and Lady of Toron in her own right."  As a result of these frequent remarriages widowed princesses and countesses carried the substantial estates to their next husbands and became seen as a prize, with various European men leaving their homes for a landed wife in the Levant. According to the courts of Outremer, half to a third of the assets of the deceased went to the widow, while the other portion was held in reserve for his children or heirs.

This system had dramatic consequences for both the Frankish Levant and Europe. In Europe land was mainly transferred through primogeniture during this period, making the power structure itself more fixed, with dowries becoming more money-based in an effort to keep land in the family.  In comparison, in Outremer lands, often reverted to the Crown before there was a chance for nobles to establish their own dynasties before they were either killed or died, allowing the Crown to retain a higher degree of control than in Europe.

Here is a partial list of those who stayed behind to manage the estates as their husbands took the cross.

From the First Crusade:
 Ermengarde of Anjou, daughter of Fulk IV, Count of Anjou, married to Alan IV, Duke of Brittany.  She served as regent of the duchy in her husband's absence on the First Crusade and possibly went to Palestine, likely on the Second Crusade.
 Arda of Armenia, the 2nd wife of Baldwin I of Jerusalem following the death of Godehilde (see above) and the first Queen consort of the Kingdom of Jerusalem.  This was a politically convenient marriage that allowed Baldwin to become the first Count of Edessa.
 Adelaide del Vasto, the 3rd wife of Baldwin I of Jerusalem, married apparently while he was still married to Arda.  Adelaide's son Roger II of Sicily by her first marriage refused to support the Crusader states during the Second Crusade due to the treatment of his mother by Jerusalem.
 Morphia of Melitene, wife of Baldwin II, King of Jerusalem. She was mother of Melisende, Queen of Jerusalem, discussed above.
 Clementia of Burgundy, wife of Robert II, Count of Flanders, who formed an army for the First Crusade.
 Ida of Leuven, daughter of Henry II, Count of Leuven and sister of Godfrey I of Leuven, was married to Baldwin II, Count of Hainaut, who served in the First Crusade with Godfrey of Bouillon.  When her husband had vanished, Ida organized a search in the Holy Land to find him, but her efforts were to no avail as he had clearly died.
 Constance of France, Princess of Antioch, daughter of Phillip I of France and Bertha of Holland.  Constance first married to Hugh I, Count of Troyes, but their marriage ended in divorce on the grounds of consanguinity.  She then married Bohemond I of Antioch, recently released by the Turks. She accompanied her husband to Apulia, where she gave birth to Bohemond II, Prince of Antioch. After her husband's death, she served as regent for her son.  Imprisoned by Grimoald, Prince of Bari, she gave up her regency, dying in 1125. Her granddaughter was Constance, Princess of Antioch, who in turn had Empress Maria, Bohemund III of Antioch, and Agnes, Queen of Hungary.
 Adela of Normandy, daughter of William the Conqueror, married to Stephen II, Count of Blois, half-brother to Hugh I, Count of Troyes.  After Stephen's death in the minor Crusade of 1102, Adela became the regent of Stephen's estate, and Constance of France served in her court. Among the children of Adela and Stephen were the future King of England, Stephen.
 Estefania, daughter of Ramon Berenguer III, Count of Barcelona, and aunt to Constance, Queen of France.  Estefania was married to Centule II, Count of Bigorre, whose successes in the First Crusade were minor, but played a major role in breaking the feudal connection with France.
 Adèle of Marie and Sibyl of Château-Porcien, were both married to the scandalous Enguerrand I, Lord of Coucy. Adèle was granddaughter to Gilbert, Count of Roucy.  Enguerrand repudiated Adèle on the grounds of adultery, with the blessing of Elinand, Bishop of Laon, and then kidnapped Sibyl who was at the time married to Godfrey I, Count of Namur.  The kidnapped Sibyl was at the time pregnant with Enguerrand's child, Agnès de Coucy. Sibyl, in her favor, was the great-grandmother of Robert of Thourotte, Bishop of Langres and Liège.  Both Enguerrand and Thomas, his son by Adèle, while bitter enemies and rivals, both took the cross and fought in the First Crusade.  Thomas succeeded his father as Lord of Coucy upon his death.
 Mary of Scotland, daughter of Malcolm III, King of the Scots, married to Eustace III, Count of Boulogne, the brother of Godfrey of Bouillon.  Eustace distinguished himself numerous times as a Crusader and returned unscathed to his estates.  Their daughter Matilda was Queen consort of England, as wife of Stephen of England.
 Talesa of Aragon, daughter of Sancho Ramírez, Count of Ribagorza, and therefore granddaughter of Ramiro I, the first King of Aragon.  Talesa was married to Gaston IV "le Croisé", Viscount of Béarn, and acted as regent for him and, after his death, for their son Centule VI after Gaston's death in 1131.  Their descendants Gaston VI and Gaston VII were valiant participants in later crusades.
 Hodierna, daughter of Hugh I, Count of Rethel, was married to Héribrand III, Lord of Hierges, and was regent of his estates during his absence during the First Crusade.  Her brother was Baldwin II, King of Jerusalem.  She secondly married Roger of Salerno, Prince of Antioch.
 Adelaide, Countess of Vermandois, was daughter of Herbert IV, Count of Vermandois and Adele of Valois, and married to renowned Crusader Hugh the Great, Count of Vermandois, a title granted by right of his wife (jure uxoris). Hugh fought in the First Crusade and then in the minor Crusade of 1101, where he was wounded by the Turks and died that October.  She was the last member of the Carolingian dynasty.
 Hildegarde, daughter of Aimery IV of Thouars, a proven companion of William the Conqueror, was married to Hugh VI "the Devil" of Lusignan, who took the cross along with his brothers Raymond IV, Count of Toulouse, a leader of the First Crusade, and Berenguer Ramon II, Count of Barcelona.
 Gertrud de Louvain, daughter of Henry III, Count of Louvain, and Gertrude of Flanders, Duchess of Lorraine, was married to Lambert, Count of Montaigu, who played a major role in the First Crusade along with his father Conan and brother Gozelo.
 Marguerite of Clermont, daughter of Renaud II, Count of Clermont-en-Beauvaisis (a member of the Crusader Army of Hugh the Great), was married to Charles the Good, Count of Flanders, a crusader who was offered the crown of Jerusalem, but refused. Later, Charles was hacked to death while in prayer in Bruges, Belgium, by rival knights.

References

Bibliography 
 Bennett, Matthew. "Military Masculinity in England and northern france c. 1050–c. 1225." in  Masculinity in medieval Europe (Routledge, 2015) pp. 81–98.
 Bom, M. Women in the Military Orders of the Crusades (Springer, 2012).
 Caspi-Reisfeld, Keren. "Women Warriors during the Crusades." in Gendering the Crusades (2002): 94+.
 Clare, Israel Smith, and Tyler, Moses V., (1898). The Library of Universal History, Volume V: The Later Middle Ages, Union Book Company, New York, 1898, pp. 1568–1586
Durant, Will (1950). The Story of Civilization, Volume IV:  The Age of Faith, Simon & Schuster, New York, pp. 585–613
Garland, Lynda, ed. (2006). Byzantine Women: Varieties of Experience, 800-1200, Ashgate Publishing, Farnham, United Kingdom.
 Hodgson, Natasha (2006). "Women and the Crusades" in Alan V. Murray The Crusades—An Encyclopedia, ABC-CLIO, Santa Barbara, 2006, pp. 1285–1291.
 Hodgson, Natasha (2007). Women, Crusading and the Holy Land in Historical Narrative, Boydell Press.
 McLaughlin, Megan. "The woman warrior: gender, warfare and society in medieval Europe" Women's Studies –an Interdisciplinary Journal, 17 (1990), 193–209.
 Maier, Christoph T. "The roles of women in the crusade movement: a survey." Journal of Medieval History 30.1 (2004): 61-82 online.
 Mazeika, Rasa. " 'Nowhere was the Fragility of their Sex Apparent': Women Warriors in the Baltic Crusade Chronicles", in From Clermont to Jerusalem: The Crusades and Crusader Societies, 1095-1500, ed. Alan V. Murray (Turnhout, 1998), pp. 229–48
Nicholson, Helen J. (2016). "La Damoisele del chastel": Women's Role in the Defence and Functioning of Castles in Medieval Writing from the Twelfth to the Fourteenth Centuries, in Crusader Landscapes in the Medieval Levant, University of Wales Press, pp. 387–402.
 Nicholson, Helen J. "Women and the Crusades." Hereford Historical Association (2008): 24+ online
 Nicholson, Helen J. "Women on the Third Crusade", Journal of Medieval History, 23 (1997), 335-49 online
 Poor, Sara, and Jana Schulman, eds. Women and the Medieval Epic: Gender, Genre, and the Limits of Epic Masculinity (Springer, 2016).
Riley-Smith, Jonathan (1998). The First Crusaders, 1095–1131. Cambridge University Press.
Riley-Smith, Jonathan, et al.  A Database of Crusaders to the Holy Land, 1095-1149.
 Stock, Lorraine Kochanske. "'Arms and the (Wo) man'in Medieval Romance: The Gendered Arming of Female Warriors in the 'Roman d'Eneas' and Heldris's 'Roman de Silence'". Arthuriana (1995): 56-83 online.

Crusades
Women of the Crusader states
 
12th-century women